2-Methylanthraquinone, an organic compound, is a methylated derivative of anthraquinone. An off-white solid, it is an important precursor to many dyes.

Synthesis and reactions
The compound is produced by the reaction of phthalic anhydride and toluene.  It can be chlorinated to give 1-chloro-2-methylanthraquinone. Nitration gives 1-nitro-2-methylanthraquinone, which can be reduced to 1-amino-2-methyl derivative. Oxidation of the methyl group gives anthraquinone-2-carboxylic acid.

References